Walter Gramatté (8 January 1897 in Berlin – 9 February 1929 in Hamburg) was a German expressionist painter who specialized in magic realism. He worked in Berlin, Hamburg, Hiddensee and Barcelona. He often painted with a mystical view of nature. Many of his works were inspired by his experiences in the First World War and his illness.

Biography
His father was a baker. He enlisted at the beginning of the war, but his poor health often exempted him from combat duty. His studies were mostly at the Kunstgewerbeschule (Arts and Crafts school) in Berlin. He opened his own studio in 1917.

In 1920, he married the Russian pianist, Sonia Fridman and became associated with Die Brücke, a group of Expressionist artists.

Despite his weak health, he travelled extensively, visiting France, Italy and Spain. He spent a great deal of time at the spa in Hiddensee and was hospitalized on several occasions, dying on 9 February 1929 of intestinal tuberculosis. His grave monument was designed by his friend, Karl Schmidt-Rottluff.

His works were classified as "Degenerate art" by the Nazi government in 1933 and were not exhibited again until after the war. He was the inspiration for the painter "Catell", a character in the novel Die Stadt hinter dem Strom by Hermann Kasack.

Appreciation
His wife, Sonia, married again, to the art historian, Ferdinand Eckhardt (1902-1995), and lived in Canada as a renowned musician and composer. To remember her and her former husband, the Eckhardt-Gramatté Foundation was established in Winnipeg, Canada.

Walter Gramatté's personal papers are preserved in the German National Museum.
A special exhibition of his paintings, titled Rediscovered: Walter Gramatté 1897-1929, took place in Hamburg's Ernst Barlach Haus from 26 October 2008 to 1 February 2009. This exhibition was organized by the Kirchner Museum in Davos, Switzerland and the Ernst Barlach Haus.

Selected paintings

Gramatté's work is displayed in the Germanisches Nationalmuseum (German National Museum) and the Neue Nationalgalerie, Berlin.

Literature 

 Claus Pese: Mehr als nur Kunst. Das Archiv für Bildende Kunst im Germanischen Nationalmuseum, Ostfildern-Ruit 1998 (Kulturgeschichtliche Spaziergänge im Germanischen Nationalmuseum, Bd.2), S.74-77.

See also
 List of German painters
 Expressionism

References

External links 
 
 Personal data and oil paintings by The Eckhardt-Gramatté-Foundation, Winnipeg, Canada
 
 
 Paintings by Gramatté in the German Galerie Remmert und Barth

1897 births
1929 deaths
20th-century German painters
20th-century German male artists
20th-century deaths from tuberculosis
German male painters
German Expressionist painters
German lithographers
German watercolourists
Artists from Berlin
Tuberculosis deaths in Germany
20th-century lithographers